is a Japanese former hurdler. She competed in the women's 80 metres hurdles at the 1952 Summer Olympics.

References

External links
 

1931 births
Possibly living people
Athletes (track and field) at the 1952 Summer Olympics
Japanese female hurdlers
Olympic athletes of Japan
Place of birth missing (living people)
Asian Games medalists in athletics (track and field)
Asian Games silver medalists for Japan
Athletes (track and field) at the 1954 Asian Games
Medalists at the 1954 Asian Games
20th-century Japanese women